Emma Louise Blackery (born 11 November 1991) is an English musician, singer, YouTube vlogger, record producer, and author. Active since 2012, Blackery has released EPs, singles, and Vevo music videos. She has toured with Busted, and headlined tours for her debut studio album Villains, released on her RWG Records label in 2018.

In 2015, Blackery's main YouTube channel had over one million subscribers. She performed and was a panelist at YouTube events (including Summer in the City and VidCon), and has contributed twice to the YouTube Rewind video series. Blackery's book, Feel Good 101: The Outsiders' Guide to a Happier Life, is based on her 2013 Feel Good 101 video series.

Music career

Debut and early success (2012–2018) 
Blackery released her debut EP, Human Behaviour, in early 2012 followed by her second EP, Distance, in July 2013. A music video for the lead track, "Go the Distance," was produced by Arthur Walwin. Her third EP, Perfect, was released on 11 November 2014. Its title track topped the UK Independent Singles Breakers Chart for one week, and entered the UK Rock & Metal Singles Chart at number eight. In 2015, Elle included Blackery on its "30 Women Under 30 Who Are Changing the World" list.

Jason Perry produced Blackery's fourth EP, Sucks to Be You, which was released in 2016. Its title track peaked at number 85 on the Scottish Singles Chart. On 4 April 2016, Blackery announced that she would join pop punk band Busted on their Pigs Can Fly tour. "Sucks to Be You" was the runner-up for the first Summer in the City Song of the Year award. After touring with Busted, Blackery toured on her own and performed her music at other YouTube events.

She released her fifth EP, Magnetised, on 26 May 2017. It spent one week on the UK Albums Chart at number 63, and peaked at number five on the UK Independent Albums Chart and number two on the Official Independent Album Breakers Chart. On 6 August, Blackery received a Summer in the City Song of the Year award for "Nothing Without You". The cover art for Magnetised was featured at the Apple Keynote event for the iPhone X in September 2017.

Villains (2018–2020) 

Blackery founded her independent record label, RWG Records, in 2018 and began work on her debut studio album Villains. She has explained that releasing on her own label gives her "control over a lot more aspects of [her] music career." On 16 March 2018, she released the lead single "Dirt", produced by Toby Scott. The song, on Spotify's New Music Friday UK playlist, was described by Record of the Day as a "slick combination of Scandi-pop" and "sassy American pop"; Blackery described "Dirt" as "best served cold". On 3 May 2018 she released her second single "Agenda" along with a lyric video. On 22 May 2018 she released the music video for "Agenda" followed by a lyric video for "Icarus" and a music video for "Take Me Out".

Blackery shared that during the album's creation, she learned more about production and the artistic direction she wanted to go in. She explained, "It was really during the album writing process that [she] learned how to create music outside of basic chords on a guitar - [she] ended up producing a large amount of the finished product that [her] fans heard and only learned after it was released that sometimes you sadly have to fight for credit on your own work." In retrospect, she also admits she would revisit the choruses on "Fake Friends" and "Take Me Out," saying she wouldn't make them as "simplistic" if she made the songs more recently.

 Blackery released Villains, on 31 August 2018. The album contains songs written in collaboration with Toby Scott, Maxwell Cooke, and Peter Hutchings. BroadwayWorld noted that "Petty" "flirts with tropical house", and the Express & Star cited elements of power pop. Lisa Hafey, praising "Third Eyes "upbeat disco sound" and "nice ABBA-y vibe", called Villains "a bit of a feminist album". In June Blackery performed "Third Eye" live at the 9th VidCon Night of Awesome. Blackery then partnered with HMV for a UK tour. Villains spent one week on the UK Albums Chart at number 24 and number 18 on the Billboard Heatseekers Albums chart. Thomas Smith noted in an NME blog how Apple events helped Sofi Tukker, Emma Blackery, and Odesza in their careers.

The European Villains Tour, planned for March 2018, was postponed until October. London based singer-songwriter Lilly Ahlberg  was the tour's special guest. The three-week tour began at Oslo's Parkteatret on 4 October, followed by performances in Stockholm, Copenhagen, Sugarfactory (Amsterdam), Hamburg, Berlin, Vienna, Munich, Cologne, Frankfurt, Academy 2 (Manchester), O2 Institute2 (Birmingham), The Garage (Glasgow), and Tramshed (Cardiff) before ending at KOKO in London on 25 October. A Never Enough Notes reviewer at KOKO saw "angst, passion, and energy in every word" and wrote that Blackery has "a knack for live shows; full of attitude, high energy and a phenomenal vocal performance".

Blackery released "Cute Without You", produced with Toby Scott, in April 2019. In July 2019, she performed at the Evoke festival in Brentwood and for BBC Radio 5 Live, where Nihal Arthanayake interviewed her for his Headliners series. In December 2019 she performed an unreleased song titled "Plot Holes" at SitC Winter Edition at the NEC.

Sixth EP and Girl in a Box (2020–present) 

Blackery released her sixth EP, My Arms Are Open, on 15 May 2020. The lead single "Wolves' was released on 2 April 2020 ahead of the EP. She went on to release lyric videos for songs "Plot Holes" and "History of Touches". She has described them as "some really personal lyric videos," which she created herself both in her home studio and outside near her home at sunset.

On 10 December 2020 Blackery released a standalone single titled "Blossom"

On 22 November 2020, Blackery announced during a YouTube video that her second studio album was in production, due to be released in 2021. On 9 June 2021, Blackery revealed her second album's title, Girl in a Box, through a series of tweets, where she posted the album's cover art, alongside the release date of 27 August 2021. These tweets include the full tracklist, revealing a total of ten songs, which includes the previously released singles "Crying", "Brutus" and "My Terms", as well as the announcement of a UK tour to promote the album, which is scheduled for February 2022. She released two singles after the album called "What Have You Done for Me Lately?" and "Cry to Your Mother" leading into the tour. She had to reschedule for June 2022 for Covid-19 reasons.

In January 2023, she announced she was working on a new EP to be released later in the year.

Other work

YouTube
Blackery was initially inspired by Shane Dawson, Smosh, Dan Howell, Phil Lester and, in 2017, by Troye Sivan. In 2018, Blackery had three active YouTube channels; other channels have been deleted, re-branded, or left inactive. 
 Emma Blackery – Blackery's main channel, created in May 2012, on which she hosts vlogs, music videos, comedy sketches, and other content. Although she began to develop a following by reading excerpts from Fifty Shades of Grey on her channel, the videos were removed due to copyright complaints. In 2018, the channel had nearly 1.5 million subscribers.
 EmmaBlackeryVEVO – created to upload her Vevo music videos, including "Nothing Without You", "Magnetised", "Don't Come Home" (lyric video), "Dirt" (acoustic version), "Agenda" (lyric video), "Icarus" (lyric video), and Take Me Out.
 Vloggery – dedicated to vlogs, including her IPOAD series of longer videos and other content not on her main channel. Blackery presented Summer in the City 2017 in three videos. EmmaBlackeryVEVO, Vloggery, and the Topic channel have been closed to subscription since May 2019, and all videos are on the main channel.
In 2013, Blackery participated in YouTube's Geek Week, and Grace Helbig featured her in a Not Too Deep podcast the following year. She received a Gold Creator Award for having over one million subscribers in 2015, and joined PewDiePie's now-defunct Revelmode network, won on Tom Scott's Game On show, was spotlighted by YouTube as one of 18 #MadeForYou UK YouTubers, and appeared in the Red Bull TV documentary Kings of Content with Louis Cole the following year. She expressed her unhappiness with YouTube Rewind after two appearances, and The Guardian cited Blackery as one of three case studies of pressure and YouTube burnout in 2018. She since admitted that she "finally stopped chasing that next viral video and [that she's] comfortable making content for [herself]."

Some of her most-viewed videos are "If Tampon Commercials Were Honest", "The Sims in Real Life", and "If Websites Started Dating". Blackery's "My thoughts on Google+" video went viral in 2013, after Tubefilter featured it as the best reaction to a new YouTube comment system. Blackery sang it again in November 2018 to celebrate the end of Google+. In December 2016, TenEighty included her "YouTube Heros (Parody)" as one of their "Five of the Best: Parody Videos".

Writing
Blackery wrote Feel Good 101: The Outsiders' Guide to a Happier Life (based on her 2013 Feel Good 101 video series), addressing depression, self-harm, anxiety and other issues. The book was published in September 2017.

Personal life
Blackery grew up in Basildon, Essex, finished sixth form at Bromfords School in Wickford, and currently lives in Birmingham. Her half-sister was born in 2007. Blackery worked as a waitress before beginning her career as musician and YouTuber.

In 2015, Blackery disclosed that she had been diagnosed with chronic fatigue syndrome and supported Liberty in North Korea. She is a WWE and Zelda fan with a Triforce and a Navi tattoo, often visible in videos and images. TenEighty interviewed Blackery and noted that she admits "her flaws and lays her damages out for everyone to see".

Her music is influenced and inspired by Busted, Blink-182, Green Day, Tessa Violet, The White Stripes, My Chemical Romance, Paramore, Avril Lavigne, Placebo, Nine Inch Nails, Twenty One Pilots, and Taylor Swift, particularly Swift's songwriting. On #WomanCrushWednesday 2017, The Daily Dot quoted YouTube's Culture and Trends team lead Earnest Pettie as calling Blackery "a thoughtful, funny, ferocious feminist unafraid of having an opinion".

In February 2023, she announced her engagement to her partner Davey Bennett.

Discography

Albums

EPs

Singles

Bibliography 
 Feel Good 101: The Outsiders' Guide to a Happier Life (Sphere, 2017)

See also

 List of YouTubers
 The Internet Takeover
 Dodie Clark
 Daniel Hardcastle
 Jacksepticeye

References

External links
 
 

1991 births
21st-century English women singers
21st-century English singers
British women record producers
Comedy YouTubers
English health and wellness writers
English record producers
English video bloggers
English YouTubers
Living people
Music YouTubers
Musicians from Essex
People from Basildon
Revelmode people